Mitch Markovich is an American percussionist, composer, educator, and clinician in the areas of rudimental drumming, marching percussion, drum and bugle corps, and marching band.  He is best known for his intensive marching snare drum solo compositions and record-setting performances, entitled "Tornado" and "Stamina", and for his percussion quartet composition entitled "Four Horsemen". Markovich's contributions to the style, notation, composition, and performance of percussion have endured over the last five decades.

He is the only person to have ever become both three-time consecutive undefeated National Champion, and the five-time consecutive undefeated Illinois State snare champion. He contributed to, or was directly responsible for twelve National and twenty-three State, Individual, and Group Championships in the drum and bugle corps marching percussion field.  He was a marching member of the National Champion Chicago Cavaliers, and he has instructed, composed, and consulted with them and with other drum corps including the following: National Champion Chicago Royal Airs; the National Champion Argonne Rebels from Great Bend, Kansas; the Santa Clara Vanguard from California;the Nisei Ambassadors from Chicago and the Millstadt Crusaders from Illinois.

Markovich is currently a clinician and concert artist for Pearl Drums and the Evans Drum Head Company. He is a drum set specialist in many styles including rock, Latin, jazz, gospel, and Contemporary christian music.

Career

Student career 
Mitch Markovich studied music at Indiana University under George Gaber, and at The American Conservatory of Music in Chicago under James Dutton.  He studied briefly under Ludwig Drum Company Clinician and National Champion Frank Arsenault, whose likeness would be later depicted upon the covers of Markovich's Rudimental Contest Series.  He received his Bachelor of Music Degree from Fort Hays State University.

Teaching career 
Mitch Markovich first developed his international reputation in percussion, as a clinician and educational representative for the Ludwig Drum Company. He has taught and performed at major universities throughout the United States including Indiana University, Ohio State University, the University of Southern California, the University of Texas, the University of Missouri at Kansas City Conservatory of Music, the University of Wisconsin, and Northwestern University.  He was the Head of the Percussion Department at Fort Hays State University.  He has been on the faculty of the Joy School of Performing Arts.

He has headed clinics and performances at the International Festival of Percussion Art in Warsaw, Poland in 2004, and 2005. He was a featured clinician at the Percussive Arts Society International Conventions in Columbus, Ohio and at Nashville, Tennessee.  He was clinician and guest soloist at the 2002 High School All-State Festival of Performance at Arizona State University. He was guest clinician and judge at the University of Texas at El Paso.

Mitch Markovich was a member of the National Championship winning Chicago Cavaliers Drum and Bugle Corps in the 1960s. He was the President of the National Association of Rudimental Drummers (N.A.R.D.) from 1976 to 1977. He has performed at the Civic Opera House, and with Dick Schory's Percussion Pops Orchestra at Chicago's Orchestra Hall. Today, he conducts private lessons, is a Pearl clinician, is an endorser of Evans drum heads, and serves in a number of Christian church bands and projects.

Notable students 
Markovich's history of students includes university department heads, professional players, teachers, and performers. The following is not an exhaustive list:
 Dean Kranzler: instructor serving concurrently at Fort Hays State University, Bethany College, Kansas Wesleyan University, and in private lessons. Kranzler plays the drum set in a band called The Blades, playing classic rock in the Kansas region.
 Mark Schnose and Jeff Sallee: drum corps musicians and inventors of percussion instruments such as the Qube

Bibliography

Musical 

Mitch Markovich is the composer of a ten-piece series titled Rudimental Contest Series, published in 1966.  This collection of rudimental solos, duets, and quartets ranges from "Easy" to "Difficult"; and it features various combinations of the snare drum, tenor drum, and bass drum.

The collection's greatest enduring impact upon percussion culture may be found in its more extremely athletically rigorous solos for marching snare drum, such as "Stamina" and "Tornado". Continuously used as audition and contest pieces over the last five decades, they are widely considered to be traditional standards. Notoriously difficult even for experts, these solos have served as authoritative benchmarks of physical performance and academic correctness.  Gregg Bissonette cited "Tornado" as an advanced traditional standard piece, in the rudimental snare section of his training video titled Private Lesson.

Rudimental Contest Series

Literature 
Mitch Markovich has authored many articles for the now defunct annual Ludwig Magazine, where he has actively detailed and encouraged the replication of his core techniques and introduced entirely new techniques.  He has consistently assured players that his music is not physically impossible, given the optimal technique.

Discography

Reception

References 

Rudimental Contest Series sources

External links 
 Official Cavaliers Drum and Bugle Corps website
 Drum Corps International

1944 births
Living people
American performance artists
American performers of Christian music
Musicians from Chicago
American percussionists
20th-century American composers
21st-century American composers
American male composers
20th-century American male musicians
21st-century American male musicians